Vyacheslav Glebovich Kupriyanov (born 23 December 1939) is a Russian poet.

Selected works
In Anyone's Tongue, Forest Books, 1993
Poems for the Hazara, Full Page Publishing, 2014
English translations of 4 prose poems in OffCourse 69 (Albany.edu)
English translation of "The Sun" in OffCourse 75 (Albany.edu)
English translations of 3 prose poems in Plume (August 2017)

References 

1939 births
Living people
20th-century Russian poets